Benjamin Kohllöffel (born 13 March 1982) is a German former professional tennis player.

A native of Herne, North Rhine-Westphalia, Kohllöffel was a left-handed player and reached a best singles ranking of 461 on the professional tour, winning two ITF Futures titles. He made ATP Challenger quarter-finals at Aschaffenburg in 2001 and Hull in 2002. His only ATP Tour appearances were in qualifying, including for the 2006 Indian Wells Masters.

Kohllöffel played collegiate tennis for the UCLA Bruins and in 2006 became the third German in a row to win the NCAA singles championship, after Benjamin Becker and Benedikt Dorsch. He defeated Somdev Devvarman in the final.

ITF Futures finals

Singles: 3 (2–1)

Doubles: 3 (1–2)

References

External links
 
 

1982 births
Living people
German male tennis players
People from Herne, North Rhine-Westphalia
Sportspeople from North Rhine-Westphalia
UCLA Bruins men's tennis players